is a 2001 Japanese drama film directed by Masahiro Kobayashi. It was screened in the Un Certain Regard section at the 2001 Cannes Film Festival.

Cast
 Ken Ogata as Nobuo Honma
 Yasufumi Hayashi as Yasuo
 Teruyuki Kagawa as Ryoichi
 Sayoko Ishii as Michiko (salmon girl)
 Nene Otsuka as Nobuko Shimizu
 Fusako Urabe as Keiko Noguchi

References

External links

2001 films
2001 drama films
2000s Japanese-language films
Japanese drama films
Films directed by Kobayashi Masahiro
Films set in Hokkaido
2000s Japanese films